The Hand Grenade is a cocktail drink (made with vodka, rum, gin and melon liquor), sold frozen or on the rocks exclusively through five licensed nightclub bars in the New Orleans French Quarter.

History
Pam Fortner and Earl Bernhardt, owners of the Tropical Isle bar founded during the 1984 Louisiana World Exposition, created the melon-flavored Hand Grenade as their signature cocktail. Since January 1992, the Hand Grenade has been served in a green, translucent, plastic yard glass container with a bulbous, textured base shaped like an oversized hand grenade.

Five French Quarter bars sell the Hand Grenade.

Popularity
Cocktail enthusiasts' opinions about the sweet and potent drink range from classifying it as a "terrible drink" (along with another similarly unique French Quarter cocktail, the Hurricane) to being "well worth the hangover".

Tropical Isle's website sells a prepared Hand Grenade mix for home use.

References

External links
Tropical Isle website

Cocktails
Cocktails with gin
Cocktails with rum
Cocktails with vodka
Cocktails with fruit liqueur
Louisiana cuisine
Cuisine of New Orleans
Melon drinks